Abdoul Bocar Ba (born 8 February 1994) is a professional footballer who plays as a defender for Libyan Premier League club Al-Ahli Tripoli. Born in Senegal, he plays for the Mauritania national team.

Club career
After Ba did not make an appearance for Auxerre since October 2018, the club was unable to agree a move for him to another club in the 2020 summer transfer window. He eventually signed for MC Oujda in Morocco in November 2020. In October 2021, he signed for Al-Ahli Tripoli in Libya.

International career
Ba played for Mauritania at the African Cup of Nations 2019, the first international tournament of the team.

References

1994 births
Living people
Citizens of Mauritania through descent
Mauritanian footballers
Association football defenders
RC Lens players
AJ Auxerre players
MC Oujda players
Championnat National 2 players
Ligue 1 players
Ligue 2 players
Championnat National 3 players
Botola players
Mauritania international footballers
2019 Africa Cup of Nations players
2021 Africa Cup of Nations players
Mauritanian expatriate footballers
Mauritanian expatriate sportspeople in France
Expatriate footballers in France
Mauritanian expatriate sportspeople in Morocco
Expatriate footballers in Morocco
Footballers from Dakar
Senegalese footballers
Senegalese people of Mauritanian descent
Sportspeople of Mauritanian descent
Expatriate footballers in Libya
Mauritanian expatriate sportspeople in Libya
Senegalese expatriate sportspeople in Libya
Senegalese expatriate sportspeople in France
Senegalese expatriate sportspeople in Morocco
Senegalese expatriate footballers
Al-Ahli SC (Tripoli) players